Retrospective was a 1995 compilation album, encapsulating Rosanne Cash's sixteen years with Columbia, released as she was leaving the label.  Rather than relying on radio hits, Retrospective focused on lesser known album tracks, unreleased material and live recordings.  In the years since, as Columbia has let the majority of Cash's albums go out of print, it has become, along with her Greatest Hits collection, the primary source for listeners to obtain most of her material.

Track listing
 "Our Little Angel" (Elvis Costello)
 "On the Surface" (Cash, Tittle)
 "All Come True" (Karl Wallinger)
 "The Wheel" (Cash)
 "Sleeping in Paris" (Cash)
 "707" (Kilzer)
 "Runaway Train" (Stewart)
 "I'm Only Sleeping" (Lennon–McCartney)
 "It Hasn't Happened Yet" (John Hiatt)
 "On the Inside" (Cash)
 "What We Really Want" (Cash)
 "I Count the Tears" (Doc Pomus, Shuman)
 "Pink Bedroom" (Hiatt)
 "Seventh Avenue" (Cash, John Leventhal)
 "A Lover Is Forever" (Steve Goodman)

References 

Rosanne Cash albums
Albums produced by John Leventhal
1995 compilation albums